Ralph Bunche High School was a school constructed in 1949 as a result of Civil Action 631 to provide "separate but equal" education for African-American students in King George County, Virginia.  The school operated until 1968 when King George High School was completed and the county's schools integrated.  The school was named for Ralph Bunche, an African-American educator, diplomat and Nobel Prize winner.

Architecture

The building continued to be used for various school uses until 1998, including at times as an elementary school, for several specialized programs, including secondary and pre-school, and for School Board administrative offices and some School Board meetings. Ralphe Bunche High School alumni formed a preservation committee in 1998 after plans to demolish the building were discussed.  In August of that year, the King George County School Board approved a resolution to preserve the building allowing it to be registered as a historical site.  In May 2007, the Ralph Bunche Alumni Association unveiled a commemorative plaque to be placed on the building.

The building is currently on the National Register of Historic Places.  In 2016, efforts were underway to turn the old school building into the Ralph Bunche Museum and Cultural Centre.

School

Notable alumni
 Al Bumbry, former Major League Baseball outfielder who played for the Baltimore Orioles and San Diego Padres

See also
King George High School

References

School buildings on the National Register of Historic Places in Virginia
Buildings and structures in King George County, Virginia
Defunct schools in Virginia
Historically segregated African-American schools in Virginia
National Register of Historic Places in King George County, Virginia
Educational institutions established in 1949
1949 establishments in Virginia